A Cape Verde hurricane or Cabo Verde hurricane is an Atlantic hurricane that originates at low-latitude in the deep tropics from a tropical wave that has passed over or near the Cape Verde islands after exiting the coast of West Africa. The average Atlantic hurricane season has about two Cape Verde hurricanes, which are often the largest and most intense storms of the season due to having plenty of warm open ocean over which to develop before encountering land or other factors prompting weakening. A good portion of Cape Verde storms are large, and some, such as Hurricane Ivan, Hurricane Dorian, Hurricane Laura and Hurricane Irma have set various records. Most of the longest-lived tropical cyclones in the Atlantic basin are Cape Verde hurricanes. While many move harmlessly out to sea, some move across the Caribbean sea and into the Gulf of Mexico, becoming damaging storms for Caribbean nations, Central America, Mexico, Bermuda, the United States, and occasionally even Canada. Research projects since the 1970s have been launched to understand the formation of these storms.

Origin
Prior to the early 1940s, the term Cape Verde hurricane referred to August and early September storms that formed to the east of the surface plotting charts in use at the time. Cape Verde hurricanes typically develop from tropical waves which form in the African savanna during the wet season, then move into the African steppes. In the years since the phrase's coining, increasing detection has allowed meteorologists to determine that since the start of the satellite era, Cape Verde hurricanes have formed as early as July 3 (Hurricane Bertha of 2008) and as late as October 10 (Hurricane Joan–Miriam of 1988).

Research
Twenty nations took part in the GATE research project in 1974, where Douglas DC-6 aircraft examined tropical waves which spawned Cape Verde hurricanes. In 2006, there was a two-month research project known as NAMMA-06 (short for NASA African Monsoon Multidisciplinary Activities) which flew Douglas DC-8s into seedling disturbances in the eastern Atlantic which had the potential to become Cape Verde hurricanes.

See also

 Atlantic hurricane season
 Tropical cyclogenesis

References

External links
 NOAA AOML Hurricane Research Division definition of a Cape Verde hurricane
 Talks about hurricanes in general and Cape Verde hurricanes

 01
Tropical cyclone meteorology
Cape Verde
Geography of Cape Verde